Azaïs is a French surname (sometimes Anglicised as Azais). Notable people with the surname include:

 Pierre Hyacinthe Azaïs (1766–1845), French philosopher
 Paul Azaïs (1903–1974), French film actor

French-language surnames